Jonathan Mathías Cubero Rieta (born 15 January 1994) is a Uruguayan professional footballer and currently is free agent.

Club career
Cubero started his career playing with Cerro in 2010. He made his debut on 4 December 2010 against Liverpool.

International career

Under-17
During 2011, Cubero played with the Uruguayan national under-17 football team at the 2011 FIFA U-17 World Cup in Mexico, where he was chosen the best goalkeeper of the tournament. Previously, he played the 2011 South American Under-17 Football Championship in Ecuador.

Under-22
In 2011, he was named to participate in the Uruguay national football team under-22 squad for the 2011 Pan American Games.

Honours

International
Uruguay U-17
 2011 FIFA U-17 World Cup: Runner-Up
 2011 South American Under-17 Football Championship: Runner-Up
Uruguay U-20
 2013 FIFA U-20 World Cup: Runner-Up

Individual
2011 FIFA U-17 World Cup: Golden Glove

References

External links
 
 Profile at goal.com

1994 births
Living people
Uruguayan footballers
Uruguayan expatriate footballers
Association football goalkeepers
Footballers at the 2011 Pan American Games
Uruguay under-20 international footballers
Uruguayan Segunda División players
C.A. Cerro players
Montevideo City Torque players
Footballers from Montevideo
Pan American Games medalists in football
Pan American Games bronze medalists for Uruguay
Medalists at the 2011 Pan American Games
Deportes Quindío footballers